Malkat al-Dar Mohamed Abdullah (Sudanese: , 1920 – 17 November 1969) was a Sudanese literary writer, educator and women's rights activist. Her novel written in the 1950s, The Wide Void, has been characterized as the first Sudanese novel in the style of social realism. Sudanese literary critic Lemya Shammat called her "a pioneer of the literary feminist renaissance and a woman of spirit and courage."

Life and career 
Malkat al-Dar Mohamed was born in El-Obaid, the capital city of today's federal state of North Kordofan. After completing primary and secondary school, she enrolled in the teachers college in Omdurman and served as a teacher after her graduation. She started learning English on her own, making use of correspondence with teachers of English in Sudan. Having taught in several Sudanese cities, she was appointed inspector for education in Kordofan in 1960. An active member of the Sudanese Women’s Union, Malkat al-Dar Mohamed, whose first name translates as "the queen of the house", passed away in 1969.

Literary critic Eiman El-Nour states that the novel "Al-Faragh al-'arid" (The Wide Void) was the first true example of a Sudanese novel in the style of social realism. The main character, Muna, is an educated woman who teaches and writes for a newspaper and further criticizes her husband for his lack of interest in national politics.

Written in the first half of the 1950s, but published only in 1969, after the death of its author, the story "depicted for the first time the life of a working woman in Sudanese society." In the same article, El-Nour qualifies this novel as romantic and presenting an idyllic image of the Sudanese countryside.

According to literary critic Marcia Lynx Qualey, Malkat al-Dar Mohamed won the first short story contest organized in 1947 by Radio Omdurman for her story about life in a Sudanese village titled “Hakim al-Qariya” or “The Village Sage". Several of her other short stories were published in local and Arab newspapers and magazines. In her stories, women are presented as important characters and thus question traditional sociocultural roles. 

Sudanese novelist Buthaina Khidr Makki (born 1948), the author of two novels called Ughniyyat al-nār (The Fire Song) 1998) and Ṣahīl al-nahr (The Whinnying of the River) (2000), said about Malkat al-Dar Mohamed: “She was extremely courageous at a time when people were asking women not to be loud and endure oppression."

Works

 The Mad Woman
 The Village Sage, 1947
 The Wide Void (in Arabic الفرغ العريض), published in 1969

See also 

 Sudanese literature
 Women in Sudan

References

Further reading 

 Muḥammad, Malakat al Dar. (1969). Al-farāgh Al-ʻarīḍ. al-Kharṭūm, al-Dār al-Sūdānīyah. OCLC 67308009
 

1920 births
1969 deaths
Sudanese women writers
20th-century women writers
20th-century Sudanese writers
Sudanese novelists